Erzurum Province, Ottoman Empire  may refer to:
Erzurum Eyalet
Erzurum Vilayet